Michael Dixon LVO, OBE, MA, FRCGP, FRCP is an English general practitioner and healthcare leader. He is Chair of The College of Medicine, Co-Chair of the National Social Prescribing Network, Visiting Professor at University College London and Westminster University and Head of the Royal Medical Household.

Career
Dixon studied psychology and philosophy at University of Oxford before studying medicine at Guy’s Hospital. He works as an NHS GP at College Surgery in Cullompton, where he was previously senior partner and has practiced as a GP since 1984.

His national appointments  have included membership of the National Leadership Network for Health and Social Care, the National Stakeholder Forum and National Steering Group for GP Commissioning. He is an Honorary Senior Fellow in Public Policy at HSMC University of Birmingham, Honorary Senior /Lecturer in Integrated Health at the Peninsula Medical School.

He has been active in the commissioning movement since the early 1990s, when he co-founded the Mid Devon Family Doctors Commissioning Group.  Since then he has campaigned for the right of GPs and practices to have a role in improving local health and services and been a prime mover in developing GP commissioning models that will allow them to do so.  He sat on the National Executive of the National Association of Commissioning GPs (NACGP) - founded in 1993, and was a co-writer of its document "Restoring the Vision" (1997), which was commissioned by the then Minister of Health, Alan Milburn.  When NACGP became NHS Alliance in 1998, he was elected Chairman and has continued in this role by annual election until he announced his retirement in 2015.  He is a frequent speaker and national advisor on GP commissioning and co-author of a number of books and chapters in this area (e.g. The Locality Commissioning Handbook (1998, Radcliffe Press) and A Practical Guide to Primary Care Groups and Trusts (2001) Radcliffe Press).

Past ministerial appointments include Chair of the NHS LifeCheck Board and Practice Based Commissioning Advisor to Lord Darzi.  He is a past President of the Health Writers Guild and was previously Senior Advisor of the King’s Fund and Steering Group member of the King’s Fund Enquiry on General Practice 

Since 2010, he has been Chair of The College of Medicine, which emphasises the importance of health and healing beyond medicines and interventions and which includes social prescription, lifestyle interventions and complementary and traditional approaches. 

He was a commissioner and health lead for the Healthy Cities Report launched in the House of Lords in 2022 and currently sits on the Health Council of Reform involved in its “Reimagining Health Programme”.

He was listed in the top ten most influential clinical leaders in the Health Service Journal 2013. He has been listed among the Pulse (magazine) most influential GPs for several years.

Honours and appointments
LVO (2015)
OBE (2001) 
Visiting Professor University College of London
Visiting Professor Westminster University
Honorary Senior Fellow, HSMC Birmingham University
Honorary Senior Lecturer Peninsula Medical School, Exeter
Medical Advisor to HRH The Prince of Wales (2002-2022)
Head of The Royal Medical Household (2022 - present)

Social prescribing
He has pioneered social prescribing in his Devon GP practice for several years, arguing it is an answer to over medicalisation and soaring health costs.  Social prescription facilitates patients with a range of social, psychological and physical problems to access a wide range of local interventions and services provided by the voluntary and volunteer sectors and others.  In 2015 he co-founded the National Social Prescribing Steering Group, which he co-chairs. This leads a network created in 2016, which now has over 3,000 members active in social prescription, which has led to social prescription becoming national policy and universally available. 

In 2016, he was appointed the first National Clinical Champion for Social Prescription (NHS England) and today he is an Ambassador for the Global Social Prescribing Network, which now includes over 22 countries offering and developing social prescription.

Complementary medicine
His other main field of interest is complementary medicine. Co-author of The Human Effect (Radcliffe Press 2000), he believes in "patient centred medicine" and the role of the patient in self healing. Reviewing the book, David Short, Emeritus Professor of Clinical Medicine at the University of Aberdeen writes "the authors urge doctors to move beyond the idea of the body as a machine.  If doctors do indeed regard their patients in this way, then this book is timely.  One cannot help feeling that what is advocated is really a return to best practice of family doctors of an earlier generation.  Perhaps the authors recognise this in saying 'what is called for is less of a revolution and more of a revival'"

Dixon describes his approach to medicine in the BBC Radio 4 programme Healthy Visions which especially focuses on prevention and looking at the whole lives of patients. He argues that it is beneficial to 'break down the boundaries' between orthodox and complementary medicine, and that an increasing number of GPs are doing so.

In a paper for the British Journal of General Practice The physician healer: ancient magic or modern science? he writes "it seems that the physician healer is now poised to rise again like a phoenix, not on a wave of nostalgia, but because modern science demands it.  Placebo research and psychoneuroimmunology are beginning to clarify a role in which caring is no longer an act of compassion or indulgence but has everything to do with curing or in the preferred modern term 'effectiveness'".

He was the medical director of The Prince's Foundation for Integrated Health, which closed in 2010 after its finance director was arrested for stealing £253,000 from the organisation. Dixon is a director of the College of Medicine which opened in 2010 with former Chair of the General Medical Council Sir Graeme Catto as its President.  He has been criticised by professor of complementary medicine and alternative medicine campaigner Edzard Ernst for advocating the use of complementary medicine. Ernst said that the stance of the NHS Alliance on complementary medicine was "misleading to the degree of being irresponsible." Ernst had previously been sympathetic to building a bridge between complementary and mainstream medicine, co-writing an article with Michael Dixon in 1997 on the benefits of such an approach.  Ernst and Dixon write "missed diagnoses by complementary therapists giving patients long term treatments are often cited but in the experience of one of the authors (MD) are extremely rare.  It can also cut both ways.  A patient was recently referred back to her general practitioner by an osteopath, who was questioning, as it turned out quite correctly, whether her pain was caused by metastates.  Good communication between general practitioner and complementary therapist can reduce conflicts and contradictions, which otherwise have the potential to put orthodox medicine and complementary therapy in an either/or situation."

Publications
 The Locality Commissioning Handbook (Radcliffe Press 1997),
 The Human Effect (Radcliffe Press 2000)
 A Practical Guide to Primary Care Groups and Trusts (Radcliffe Press 2000)
Practice-based Commissioning: From good idea to effective practice 2007
Co-author of many NHS Alliance documents including Implementing the Vision (2000) and Vision in Practice (2002), Breaking Boundaries (2012) and Think Big, Act Now (2014).  He has written a number of original research papers mainly covering areas of general practice.  
He has previously been a health columnist for "SHE" magazine.
Time to Heal: Tales of a Country Doctor (Unicorn Publishing Group 2020)

Personal life
In his free time, he gardens and fishes whenever possible.  His wife, Joanna, is a professional artist and they have three children, two of whom are GPs and the other working in health and science policy.

References

21st-century English medical doctors
Living people
British medical writers
National Health Service people
Officers of the Order of the British Empire
Year of birth missing (living people)
Medical doctors from Devon
People from Cullompton